The Miyazawa Cabinet (Japanese: 宮澤内閣) governed Japan from 1991 to 1992. It was led by Prime Minister Kiichi Miyazawa.

Ministers 

 Michio Watanabe - Deputy Prime Minister and Minister for Foreign Affairs
 Tsutomu Hata - Minister of Finance
 Tokuo Yamashita - Minister of Health and Welfare
 Masami Tanabu - Minister of Agriculture, Forestry and Fisheries
 Kōzō Watanabe - Minister of International Trade and Industry
 Kunio Hatoyama - Minister of Education

References 

1991 establishments in Japan
1992 disestablishments in Japan
Cabinet of Japan
1991 in Japanese politics
1992 in Japanese politics
Cabinets established in 1991
Cabinets disestablished in 1991